Bishop Peak  is a  volcanic plug in San Luis Obispo, California. It is the tallest of the Morros or "Nine Sisters", a chain of similar peaks stretching to Morro Bay. Often said to take its name from its resemblance to a bishop's miter, it is named in homage to the town's name (San Luis Obispo). "Obispo" is the Spanish word for Bishop.

Geology 
Like the other Morros, Bishop Peak is primarily composed of dacite. About 20 to 25 million years ago, magma welled up underneath a layer of softer rock and solidified. The softer overlying rock has since eroded away, leaving a distinct rugged shape.

Wildlife 
Bishop Peak's thin, rocky soil supports many plants that are not common in the surrounding area. Vegetation includes an Oak woodland, sage scrub and chaparral.

Woodland areas are composed of species like coast live oak and California bay trees, as well as poison oak and California blackberry. Scrub areas support many aromatic varieties of sagebrush, coyote bush, and monkeyflower.

Bird life includes large numbers of jays and other passerine birds, as well as birds of prey including golden eagles, bald eagles, owls and vultures. Mammals include deer, raccoons and opossums as well as predators like foxes, coyotes, bobcats and mountain lion.

Land use
In the past some quarrying has taken place, primarily to provide stone for the nearby city of San Luis Obispo.  Granite from the quarry can be found along curbs in most of the city's older neighborhoods and on several extant structures, most notably, First Presbyterian Church. Currently Bishop Peak Natural Reserve includes  of land purchased or donated since 1977.

There are several trails in the Open Space with trailheads on Patricia Drive and at the end of Highland Drive. The Felsman Loop Trail covers the northeast base and connects with Bishop Peak Trail, which climbs the South slope to the summit. There is a third possible trailhead on Foothill Blvd. accessing a steep fall line trail on private property which intersects the Bishop Peak Trail partway up.  Residents surrounding Bishop Peak prefer for hikers to use the Patricia Drive Trailhead, which offers a  round trip hike to the summit, ascending .

There are many access trails that rock climbers use regularly on Bishop Peak to access different climbing walls. One of these trails, the 'Oh Man' trail starts just to the left of the cracked wall, which is off of the Highland or Patricia Drive trailheads, and it can be taken as an alternate route to the summit. It was named the 'Oh Man' trail due to the fact that it is a short, springy trail and it must be taken at a steady tempo in order to maintain safety. It is rated a Scramble Class 4, but it is off of the main trail, and therefore access is currently closed.

Gallery

References

External links 

 

Nine Sisters
Mountains of San Luis Obispo County, California
Volcanic plugs of California
Mountains of Southern California
San Luis Obispo, California